The Royal Memorial Church of St George, Cannes, was erected in the 19th century in honour of The Duke of Albany, the son of Queen Victoria, who died in Cannes in 1884. His brother, the Prince of Wales commissioned the church to be built in his honour.

It was founded in 1886 and consecrated in the presence of the Prince of Wales a year later. Queen Victoria visited in 1887, 1891, and 1898 for the confirmation of Princess Alice. In 1970 it was sold to the city of Cannes, becoming a Catholic Church in 1974.

In style it is early English Gothic, the work of Sir Arthur Blomfield. The statue of St George above the entrance door is by F. W. Pomeroy.

"The very beautiful memorial chapel to the Duke of Albany at Cannes nears completion. It is to be opened this month. Throughout the work the Prince of Wales has taken the keenest interest, consulting with Sir Arthur Blomfield, and questioning the minutest details. In his helpers Sir Arthur has been very fortunate. Messrs. Heaton, Butler and Bayne are responsible for some of the windows, and Messrs. Powell for at least one other, while the decorations under Sir Arthur's guidance have been carried along by Mr. Charles Floyce. Mr. Floyce is a student of the old masters. Those who recall him years ago as a student at the National Gallery engaged persistently in making faithful copies of the old Italian masters — Crivelli, Fra Angelico, and Luini, whom he got to understand as a book, will be glad to know that his training has not been lost."

References

External links
 The Royal Memorial Church of St George" 1891 Archives municipales
 EGLISE SAINT-GEORGES LA PAROISSE CATHOLIQUE SAINT NICOLAS

Cannes
Anglican church buildings in France
Gothic Revival church buildings in France
Arthur Blomfield church buildings
19th-century churches in France
19th-century Anglican church buildings